USS Chickasaw may refer to the following ships of the United States Navy:

 , a monitor in commission from 1864 to 1865
 , a tug commissioned in 1898 and sold in 1913
 , a tug commissioned in 1943 and sold in 1976

United States Navy ship names